Capital punishment is legal in Syria. The Syrian government holds a retentionist view of capital punishment  Current laws allow the death penalty for treason; espionage; murder; arson resulting in death; attempting a death-eligible crime; recidivism for a felony punishable by forced labor for life; political acts and military offences such as bearing arms against Syria in the ranks of the enemy, desertion of the armed forces to the enemy, insubordination, acts of incitement under martial law or in wartime; violent robbery; terrorism; subjecting a person to torture or barbaric treatment during the commission of gang-robbery; rape; membership in the Muslim Brotherhood; joining the Islamic State of Iraq and the Levant; drug trafficking of narcotics; political dissidence and falsification of material evidence resulting in a third party being convicted for a drug offense and sentenced to death.

References

 

Syria
Law enforcement in Syria
Human rights abuses in Syria
Death in Syria